Ralph Pickover (died in 1614/1615) was an English priest. 

Pickover was educated at Christ Church, Oxford. He held livings at Ludgershall and Winterbourne Cherborough. He was archdeacon of Rochester from 1576 to 1584; and archdeacon of Sarum from 1585 until his death on 8 March 1614/1615.

References

1500s births
1615 deaths
Alumni of Christ Church, Oxford
Archdeacons of Rochester
Archdeacons of Salisbury
16th-century English Anglican priests
17th-century English Anglican priests